Shinagawa Takahisa (品川 高久, 1576 – September 1, 1639) was a Japanese samurai of the early Edo period, who served the Tokugawa clan. He was a hatamoto, and the son of Imagawa Ujizane.

Ancestry

1576 births
1639 deaths
Imagawa clan
Samurai
Hatamoto